The Green River Shell Middens Archeological District is a historic district composed of archaeological sites in the U.S. state of Kentucky.  All of the district's sites are shell middens along the banks of the Green River that date from the later portion of the Archaic period.  Studies of this assemblage of sites were critical in the development of knowledge of the Archaic period in the eastern United States.

Kentucky's Green River runs through a broad alluvial plain, from which outcroppings of  bedrock project.  The plain is an area that was inundated during the Pleistocene by a water body dubbed Lake Green, which resulted in the deposition of large amounts of silt.  The middens of this district are typically located along the prehistoric routes of waterways that were established after Lake Green was drained.  Archaic period Native Americans were drawn to these waterways by an abundance of mussels.

The district was established and named a National Historic Landmark on May 5, 1994.  Each of the district's twenty-three contributing properties had previously been listed on the National Register of Historic Places by itself.  The sites are distributed among five counties: Butler County (BT), Henderson County (HE), McLean County (McL), Muhlenberg County (MU), and Ohio County (OH).

Contributing properties
The district comprises the following sites, listed by their Smithsonian trinomials; names are provided for named sites.

See also
Indian Knoll, another shell midden in the region not included in the district
List of National Historic Landmarks in Kentucky

References

External links

National Historic Landmarks in Kentucky
Geography of Butler County, Kentucky
Geography of Henderson County, Kentucky
Geography of McLean County, Kentucky
Geography of Muhlenberg County, Kentucky
Geography of Ohio County, Kentucky
Shell middens in the United States
Archaeological sites on the National Register of Historic Places in Kentucky
Historic districts on the National Register of Historic Places in Kentucky
National Register of Historic Places in Ohio County, Kentucky
National Register of Historic Places in Butler County, Kentucky
National Register of Historic Places in Henderson County, Kentucky
National Register of Historic Places in McLean County, Kentucky
National Register of Historic Places in Muhlenberg County, Kentucky
Green River (Kentucky)
National Historic Landmark Districts
Archaic period in North America